Colette Thomas (10 February 1929 – 31 March 2001) was a French swimmer who won a bronze medal in the 400 m freestyle at the 1950 European Aquatics Championships. She competed in four freestyle events at the 1948, 1952 and 1956 Summer Olympics with the best achievement of seventh place in the 4 × 100 m relay in 1948.

References

External links 
 

1929 births
2001 deaths
Swimmers at the 1948 Summer Olympics
Swimmers at the 1952 Summer Olympics
Swimmers at the 1956 Summer Olympics
Olympic swimmers of France
French female freestyle swimmers
European Aquatics Championships medalists in swimming
20th-century French women